Joey Ryan Gundok (born 9 May 1983) is a Malaysian professional footballer from state of Sabah. He play as a midfielder.

He played for Sabah FA since 2003 season but move to Perlis FA for 2006/07 season. He return to Sabah after 2007/08 season ended for the trial with his former team Sabah FA.

References

1983 births
Living people
Malaysian footballers
People from Sabah
Sabah F.C. (Malaysia) players
Perlis FA players
DPMM FC players
Expatriate footballers in Brunei
Association football midfielders